Georges Robini (6 September 1913 – 22 July 2003) was a Monegasque sports shooter. He competed  in the trap event at the 1952 Summer Olympics.

References

External links

1913 births
2003 deaths
Monegasque male sport shooters
Olympic shooters of Monaco
Shooters at the 1952 Summer Olympics
Place of birth missing